Heewon or Hee-won may refer to:

People
 Kim Hee-won (born January 10, 1971), South Korea actor
 Han Hee-won (born June 10, 1978), South Korea retire Golf sport
 Kim Hee-won (ice hockey) (born August 1, 2001), South Korea Ice hockey sport

Arts and entertainment

Entertainment
 Heewon Entertainment a South Korea company

Fictional Characters
 Heewon from 
 Jung Heewon from the novel Webtoon Omniscient Reader